Lutte Pour Le Changement (LUCHA ) is a group based in Goma in eastern Democratic Republic of Congo who fights for a class of rights that protect Congoleses' freedom from infringement by governments, social organizations, and private individuals. They ensure one's ability to participate in the civil and political life of the Congolese society and state without discrimination or repression.

Background

This group was born out of frustration with the current political process and diminished social condition in the Democratic Republic of Congo by a group of young Congolese students. These students understood that violence is not the way for anyone willing to find durable solutions to political and social disputes and wars that have torn their country apart for the past half century.

The one thing that defines the Lutte Pour Le Changement activists is their love for their native DR Congo and the hope to see it prosperous and developed in their lifetime. They have decided to organize a series of non-violent actions throughout major cities in the country to shed light to some of the critical issues facing the Congolese population. Their actions are not limited to keeping politicians honest, but rather engaging the population into participating in the social issues debates. The movement started in the eastern city of Goma in the Democratic Republic of Congo in mid-June 2011 and in no time, the movement had spread all the way to the west of the country, with famous members such as Fred Bauma and Yves Makwambala being incarcerated since March 2015 at the Congolese National Intelligence Agency headquarters in Kinshasa. On March 15, 2015, according to the online news media Pragmora, "About 30 youth activists and international journalists and observers were arrested in Kinshasa during a youth workshop aimed at increasing youth participation in politics and the electoral process, and creating a new youth movement, Filimbi". In the recent uprising, many of the LUCHA activists arrested during Dec 19, 2016 have been released, including the 23 year old Gloria Sengha Panda Shala according to Ida Sawyer a Human Rights Watch Director in Central Africa.

The first LUCHA protest to receive widespread attention was the effort to get the young people to get involved in the 2011 presidential and legislatives elections by ensure that all eligible to vote got registered ahead of the upcoming the elections. Then followed a few actions in regards to lack of clean water in Goma and also issue with garbage waste in the same city. This movement got the eye of the Congolese people because this group managed first and foremost to get the general population to have a say in these critical matters facing their livelihood through the streets of various Congolese cities namely Kinshasa, Mbuji-Mayi, Lubumbashi, Kisangani et Goma.

Goals
The group is determined to ensure there is better governance, respect for human rights and improved and much stronger democracy in the country that faced 32 years of President Mobutu Dictatorship. These inspired Congolese youths driven by social injustice and non democratic political process believe that their movement can bring about positive change in the DR Congo, as well as Africa as a whole.

These courageous young men have come to know nothing but armed conflicts all of their teenage and adult lives.  Therefore, when deciding to create the movement they decided that they will only use non-violent actions as the core principal in raising awareness on social and political issues facing the DRC.  Nevertheless, most of these youths have been detained without charge during peaceful protest and /or gatherings.  Some of the famous members detained by the Congolese national intelligence agency and have made claims of moral and physical abuses while incarcerated.

Slogan
We are leaders. Not hostages of the past. Nor slaves of the present. Nor beggars of our future!

It also reads on their official site:

WE ARE NOT VIOLENT

WE RISK TOGETHER

WE ASSUME OUR ACTS

Methods
LUCHA activists have used web technologies and social media like Facebook, Twitter, and Meetup to coordinate events. The digital evolution with the improvements on the application such as WhatsApp, Imo and Skype has helped the movement with communications, conference calls  among participants in various locations within the DR Congo as well as the Congolese diaspora via various Congolese online media, such as Congo Mikili. The group has also been organizing workshops across the country to teach youth on how to engage in social and political issues.

Notable members 
 Grace Kabera - Human Rights Activist
Luc Nkulula - Human Rights Activist
 Judith Maroy- Human Rights Activist

References

Civil rights organizations
Organisations based in the Democratic Republic of the Congo